Canaro is a comune (municipality) in the Province of Rovigo in the Italian region Veneto, located about  southwest of Venice and about  southwest of Rovigo.

Geography
The municipality of Canaro contains the frazioni (subdivisions, mainly villages and hamlets) Baruchella, Boccalara, C. Benvenuto Tisi, C.Mella, C.Ruggieri, Ca' Matta, Croce del Sud, Crociara, Garofolo, Giaretta, La Frattina, Mezzavia, Paviole, Tenasi, Valiera, Vallone, and Viezze.

Canaro borders the following municipalities: Ferrara, Fiesso Umbertiano, Frassinelle Polesine, Occhiobello, Polesella and Ro.

Demographic evolution

Twin towns
Canaro is twinned with:

  Gmina Pszczew, Poland

References

External links

 Canaro official website

Cities and towns in Veneto